Ernesto Togni (6 October 1926 – 11 November 2022) was a Swiss Roman Catholic prelate.

Togni was born in Switzerland and was ordained to the priesthood in 1950. He served as bishop of the Roman Catholic Diocese of Lugano from 1978 until his resignation in 1985.

References

1926 births
2022 deaths
Swiss Roman Catholic bishops
20th-century Roman Catholic bishops in Switzerland
Bishops appointed by Pope Paul VI
Pontifical Gregorian University alumni
People from Locarno District